, commonly referred to as Matrix Software, is a Japanese video game development company located in Tokyo. Founded in July 1994 by former members of Climax Entertainment and Telenet Japan, the company has since created games for a number of systems beginning with their action-adventure game title Alundra in April 1997. Matrix has teamed with other developers such as Square Enix and Chunsoft to produce games for existing franchises such as Final Fantasy and Dragon Quest, as well as other anime and manga properties.  In addition to game console development, Matrix Software has also made games for various Japanese mobile phone brands since 2001.

Company history
Matrix Software was founded in July 1994 by Kosuke Ohori and three friends who had each been involved in the video games industry for many years beforehand.  Kosuke, a veteran of the game development industry since high school, joined with former members of Climax Entertainment and Telenet Japan to create a company that he felt would "bring people serious game content". Nearly three years after their establishment, the company released their first game, Alundra for the PlayStation game console in April 1997, which would prove popular enough to receive a sequel two years later. In September 1999, Matrix obtained their first business partner in Chunsoft, with whom they collaborated to create a spin-off to their popular Dragon Quest series, Torneko: The Last Hope. Since then, the company would join with other companies to create games for other entertainment franchises such as Yoshihiro Togashi's YuYu Hakusho, Eiichiro Oda's One Piece, and Square Enix's Final Fantasy.

Games developed

See also
 Climax Entertainment
 Telenet Japan

References

External links
 Matrix Software Homepage 

Software companies based in Tokyo
Video game companies established in 1994
Video game companies of Japan
Video game development companies
 
Japanese companies established in 1994